Winston Kalengo (born 29 August 1985) is a Zambian footballer who plays for Republic of the Congo club AC Léopards.

Style of Play 

Winston Kalengo has had longevity in the game that most other players only dream of. 11 seasons in the Zambian Super League. His 103 goals speak volumes. Scoring more than 100 goals is a feat that escapes most strikers during their entire careers. Kalengo’s strength in the box and acceleration when he is next to a defender is extremely impressive, and on one on one situation’s with a goalkeeper trust Kalengo to bury the ball past the keeper most of the time.

Kalengo does have weaknesses though; he rarely tracks back and loves to drift to the wings sometimes leaving his team with no options in the middle. He is noted for his physical strength, ability in the air, and his ability to retain possession of the ball. His powerful and intrusive approach has made Winston Kalengo the lone striker Zesco United's Zambian fans have grown to admire, and in recent years, it has become nearly impossible for opposing teams to isolate him and freeze him out of the games.

Kalengo has been known to strike the ball with power and pace. He is a specialist especially from central positions, with a style which revolves around beating the goalkeeper with speed and depth. All in all, with the highs and lows of playing in the Zambian Premier League, Winston has given many fans a smile with his performances and his 13 years of nonstop goal scoring action should only serve as a testimony for hundreds of younger players around the world.

Club career

Early career 
Kalengo was born on 29 August 1985 in Livingstone, the tourist capital of Zambia, in southern Africa.

Zanaco FC 
In 2003 a young striker scored twice for Zanaco as they over came Roan United 2-1 in a Week 13 match  first goals for Zanaco in a Week 13 match. That young striker was Winstone Kalengo, and the brace goal were his first goal in the ZSL. Winston went on to score 9 goals in the 2003 season as a young striker with competition from the big name Zanaco strikers of Rotson Kilambe, Edward Kangwa and Cosmas Banda.

In 2004 with increased competition he only scored 4 goals for Zanaco.

He surprisingly he did not get much of a run in 2005 and didn’t score a goal though he still ended up a champion as Zanaco ran out winners of the Primera Division de Zambia.

Winstone Kalengo’s break out year was in 2006 when he scored 28 goals in all competitions with 16 league goals to become the Primera Division de Zambia top scorer and take Zanaco to another title and also his second straight title.

After that feat Kalengo did not have it that easy as he averaged 5 goals a season between 2007 and 2010. Kalengo still managed to win one more title with Zanaco in 2009.

Zesco United FC 
In 2011 Kalengo joined fierce rivals Zesco United, by this time he had scored 52 goals in 7 seasons with Zanaco.

Kalengo hit the ground running at Zesco United scoring on debut in Week 1 in a 2-0 win over Kabwe Warriors. Kalengo went to finish the season on 8 goals though Zesco United did not win the Primera Division de Zambia title.

Return to Zanaco FC 
In 2012 Kalengo hit a snag as he went back to his Zanaco days where he struggled for goals, scoring only 5 that season.

Return to Zesco United FC 

2013 was an outstanding year for Kalengo, Scoring 13 ZSL goals which is his second highest goal scoring feat. Zesco United couldn’t win the title though as Nkana won it in an enthralling title race that lasted till the last day. Kalengo’s last goal of that season was against Nkana in Week 29 which took him to 78 goals which is an unprecedented goal tally since 2004.

2014 and 2015 saw Kalengo win back to back Primera Division de Zambia titles with Zesco United. He finished as top scorer in the league in the 2015 season scoring 18 goals, meaning he would leave Zesco United for A.C. Leopards on a high.

A.C. Leopards 
In December 2015, A.C. Leopards confirmed that they had signed Kalengo on a 1-year contract from Zesco United.

Return to Zesco United (2017) 
Winston Kalengo has made it clear that he intends to return to Zesco United after his contract with A.C. Leopards ends.

International career

International goals
Scores and results list Zambia's goal tally first.

Records
Kalengo is the leading scorer in ties between Zesco United and Zanaco. He has scored 12 times in these ties with 6 goals for each team. Another very intriguing statistic about Kalengo is that he has only lost in 3 matches that he has scored in. In a career stretching over 9 years. And Kalengo’s teams have won 52 matches in which he has scored in and drawn 6 matches.

To put it simply into numbers if Kalengo scores there is an 85% chance that his team will win! So both Zanaco and Zesco United have won most of the games he has scored in. Ironically though, Kalengo’s first loss in a match that he had scored in came against Forest Rangers in 2005 which also happened to be the match that broke Zanacos 40 game unbeaten league record that stretched back to 2004.

Kalengo finished the 2015 Primera Division de Zambia season as top scorer with 18 goals, helping Zesco United to the league title.

Nicknames
So why the tag "King of the Hill"? Imagine that all the goals in the ZSL from 2004 to date were gathered and piled up, they would probably make quite a hill. Kalengo with his high scoring feat would be resting pretty at the top of that hill. Zesco United's Colombian fans affectionately nicknamed him as Kalengoal due to his prolific goal-scoring form.

Honours 
Zanaco
Winner
 Zambian Premier League: 2005, 2006, 2009

ZESCO United
Winner
 Zambian Premier League: 2014, 2015

References

External links 
 
 

1985 births
Living people
People from Livingstone, Zambia
Zambian footballers
Zambia international footballers
Zambian expatriate footballers
AC Léopards players
Expatriate footballers in the Republic of the Congo
Association football forwards